Peebles is a surname. Notable people with the surname include:

 Alison Peebles, Scottish actress
 Andy Peebles, British disc jockey
 Ann Peebles, American singer
 Antony Peebles, British pianist
 Curtis Peebles, aerospace historian
 David Peebles, Scottish Renaissance composer
 Florence Peebles, American biologist
 George Peebles, Scottish footballer
 H. M. Peebles, English entomologist
 Ian Peebles, English cricketer
 James Martin Peebles, American author, organizer
 John Peebles, Canadian politician
 Mario Van Peebles, American actor, son of Melvin Van Peebles
 Mary Louise Peebles, American children's writer as Lynde Palmer
 Melvin Van Peebles, American actor, writer and director
 P. J. E. Peebles, Canadian-American cosmologist
 R. Donahue Peebles, African-American hotel developer
 Richard Peebles, Scottish singer known as Rikki
 Robert Hibbs Peebles, American botanist
 Sarah Peebles, American composer

Fictional characters
 Melvin Peebles, character on The Magilla Gorilla Show